The Char de dépannage DNG/DCL is an armoured recovery vehicle built upon the chassis of the Leclerc battle tank.

The DCL comes as a replacement for the AMX-30 D in the role of a recovery and repair tank for battle tanks over 50 tonnes. Nexter designates it DNG (Dépanneur Nouvelle Génération, "next generation repair"); the French Army uses the term DCL (Dépanneur du Char Leclerc, "Leclerc tank repair").

The main role of the DCL is tugging disabled tanks out of a battle zone; its secondary roles include repairing damaged tanks, and helping in military engineering. For these roles, it is fitted with a crane which allows removing a tank turret, and a bulldozer blade.

20 DCL are currently in service in the French Army. One is deployed in South Lebanon in support of the 13 Leclerc tanks of the UNIFIL. 46 DCL are in service in the United Arab Emirates.

Equipment 
 Main winch: 180m long, 35 tonnes tugging
 Secondary winch: 230m, 1.3 tonne
 Crane: 30 tonnes lifting
 3.4 metre bulldozer blade
 Diesel generator
 20 DREB smoke generators
 1 x 12.7 mm machine gun

Notes and references 

 GIAT
 chars-francais.net

Armoured fighting vehicles of France
Tracked armoured recovery vehicles
Military vehicles introduced in the 1990s